In the Groove may refer to:

Music
"In the Groove" (composition), a classic jazz composition by Mary Lou Williams
In the Groove (Marvin Gaye album), 1968
In the Groove (Planet Drum album), 2022
In the Groove, album by Jim Messina, 2017
In the Groove, album by Barry Goldberg, 2018
"In the Groove", song by Enuff Z'Nuff from Enuff Z'nuff, 1989

Other uses
In the Groove (video game series), a music video game series produced by Roxor
In the Groove (video game), the first game in the series
In the Groove (horse) (foaled 1987), a British Thoroughbred racehorse

See also
In a Groove, a 2008 album by Jonny Blu
Down in the Groove, a 1988 album by Bob Dylan
"Into the Groove", a song by Madonna